The Imperial Japanese Army 18th Independent Mixed Brigade was an Independent Mixed Brigade formed November 7, 1939, in occupied China. It was assigned to the 11th Army. The unit was engaged in the Central Hupei Operation during the Second Sino-Japanese War. The brigade was re-organized as the 58th Division on 2 February 1942.

Organization 
The 18th Independent Mixed Brigade consisted of the following units.
 92nd Independent infantry battalion 
 93rd Independent infantry battalion 
 94th Independent infantry battalion 
 95th Independent infantry battalion 
 96th independent infantry battalion 
 artillery troops 
 labor troops 
 signal communication unit

Commanders 
 Lt. Gen Taka Kayashima 1939 - 1941

See also 
 IJA Independent Mixed Brigades

References

Independent Mixed Brigades (Imperial Japanese Army)
Military units and formations established in 1939
Military units and formations disestablished in 1942
1939 establishments in Japan
1942 disestablishments in Japan